Graham Mitchell (born 2 November 1962) is a Scottish former professional football player who played for Hamilton Academical, Hibernian, and Falkirk in the 1980s and 1990s.

Mitchell began his career at Hamilton Academical, making over 175 league appearances before joining Hibernian in 1986. A natural left footer who soon became an important part of Alex Miller's side, winning the Scottish League Cup 1991-92, and went on to make over 250 league appearances for the club.

External links 

1962 births
Living people
Footballers from Glasgow
Scottish footballers
Association football defenders
Hamilton Academical F.C. players
Hibernian F.C. players
Falkirk F.C. players
Scottish Football League players